Linus, a male given name, is the Latin form of the Greek name Linos. It's a common given name in Sweden. The origin of the name is unknown although the name appears in antiquity both as a musician who taught Apollo and as a son of Apollo who died in infancy.

People
Linus (Argive), son of Apollo and Psamathe in Greek mythology
Linus of Hollywood (Linus Dotson, born 1973), American musical artist
Linus of Thrace, musician and master of eloquent speech in Greek mythology
Pope Linus (died c. 76), the second Bishop of Rome and Pope of the Catholic Church
Linus Arnesson (born 1994), Swedish ice hockey player
Linus Bylund (born 1978), Swedish politician
Linus B. Comins (1817–1892), member of the U.S. House of Representatives from Massachusetts in 1857–59
Linus Diaz (born 1933), Sri Lankan long-distance runner
Linus Eklöf (born 1989), Swedish motorcycle speedway rider
Linus Eklöw (better known by his stage name Style of Eye) (born 1979), Swedish DJ, producer, and songwriter
Linus Fernström (born 1987), Swedish hockey player
Linus Forslund (born 1988), Swedish bandy player 
Linus Reinhard Frey (also known as "Lonny Frey") (1910–2009), American baseball player
Linus Fröberg (born 1993), Swedish hockey player
Linus Gerdemann (born 1982), German professional road bicycle racer
Linus Hallenius (born 1989), Swedish footballer
Linus Hultström (born 1992), Swedish hockey player
Linus Klasen (born 1986), Swedish hockey player
Francis Line (also known as Linus of Liège) (1595–1675), English Jesuit priest and scientist
Linus Malmborg (born 1988), Swedish footballer
Linus Malmqvist (born 1981), Swedish footballer
J. Linus McAtee (1897–1963), American Hall of Fame jockey
DJ Linus (born 1957), Italian deejay
Linus Omark (born 1987), Swedish hockey player
Linus Pauling (1901–1994), American chemist, winner of two Nobel Prizes (chemistry and peace)
Linus Persson (ice hockey) (born 1985), Swedish ice hockey right winger
Linus Persson (handballer) (born 1993), Swedish handball player
Linus Pettersson (born 1987), Swedish bandy player 
Linus Roache (born 1964), English actor
Linus Rönnqvist (born 1988), Swedish bandy player 
Linus Sebastian (born 1986), Canadian YouTuber, creator and host of Linus Tech Tips and founder of Linus Media Group
Linus Sandgren (born 1972), Swedish Cinematographer
Linus Sköld (born 1983), Swedish politician
Linus Sundström (born 1990), Swedish speedway rider
Linus Svenning (born 1990), Swedish singer-songwriter 
Linus Thörnblad (born 1985), Swedish high jumper
Linus Tornblad (born 1993), Swedish footballer 
Linus Torvalds (born 1969), Finnish-born American programmer, creator of the Linux kernel
Linus Ullmark (born 1993), Swedish hockey player
Linus Videll (born 1985), Swedish hockey player
Linus Wahlgren (born 1976), Swedish actor
Linus Wahlqvist (born  1996), Swedish footballer 
Linus Werneman (born 1992), Swedish hockey player 
Linus Yale Jr. (1821–1868), American mechanical engineer, son of Yale, Sr.
Linus Yale Sr. (1797–1858), American inventor and manufacturer of locks

Characters
Linus (mythology)
Linus, a recurring character in Star Trek: Discovery
Ben Linus, in the US television show Lost
Linus van Pelt, in the comic strip Peanuts
 Linus Caldwell, in Ocean's Eleven (2001), played by Matt Damon
 Linus Larrabee, in Sabrina (1954 film) and Sabrina (1995 film)
 Linus Rawlings, in How the West Was Won (film), played by James Stewart
 Linus Spacehead, a playable character in the Quattro Adventure and Linus Spacehead's Cosmic Crusade video games

References 

Masculine given names
Swedish masculine given names
German masculine given names
Dutch masculine given names
Norwegian masculine given names
Danish masculine given names
Finnish masculine given names
Icelandic masculine given names
English masculine given names